Tiktok is a 2015 Ugandan silent short film written and directed by Usama Mukwaya. The movie features single actor Patriq Nkakalukanyi as Sam. It is Usama's first film under his film company O Studios Entertainment and is his first film as a writer, director and producer. The film premiered at the inaugural Mashariki African Film Festival and received a nomination for best short film.

Plot 
After being appointed to a new job, Sam (protagonist) begins his much-anticipated first day at work. He arrives, but this time around with precautions to manage his previously disorganized self. He drafts a new set of guidelines to help him improve and break out of his bad past habits, only to realize that some of the guidelines at work are against him. When he finally maneuvers through the preparation tasks, towards exiting the house, he notices that neighbors have been waiting for him on the door to join them to go for church service. He now realizes he had woken up on a wrong day, the day just before the actual day he must start work.

Cast  
 Patriq Nkakalukanyi as Sam

Production 
Principal production of the film began in September 2014. Director Usama Mukwaya hired Alex Ireeta as Director of Photography, having worked with him on his previous film Bala Bala Sese.

References

External links
 

Ugandan short films
Films shot in Uganda
2015 films
Films directed by Usama Mukwaya
Films produced by Usama Mukwaya
Films with screenplays by Usama Mukwaya
O Studios Entertainment films